The 1991 Hong Kong Legislative Council election was held for members of the Legislative Council of Hong Kong (LegCo). The election of the members of functional constituencies was held on 12 September 1991 and the election of geographical constituency seats was held on 15 September respectively. It was the first ever direct election of the Legislative Council in Hong Kong history. There were 18 members from directly elected geographical constituencies, 21 members from functional constituencies, 17 members appointed by the Governor, and 3 official members.

A coalition of the United Democrats and the Meeting Point, together with other smaller parties, groups and independents in the pro-democracy camp had a landslide victory, getting 16 of the 18 geographical constituency seats. Two-seat constituency two vote system was used with two seats to be filled in each constituency. The voting system helped the pro-democracy coalition win with landslide success and faced criticisms. In the end, the government prescribed simple plurality in the next election.

Background

After the Sino-British Joint Declaration signed in December 1984 stated the sovereignty of Hong Kong would be transferred from the United Kingdom to the People's Republic of China, the pace of the democratisation towards a government of high autonomy towards 1997 became a major political debate. The Hong Kong government denied the demand of the pro-democracy groups of introducing direct elections in the 1988 Legislative Council elections, due to the main opposition from Beijing and the conservative business and professional elites. As a result, the electoral methods of the functional constituencies being elected by different business and professional sectors and the Electoral Colleges being elected by the District Boards and the two municipal councils (Urban Council and Regional Council) remained in the 1988 elections but it was promised by the government that direct elections would be introduced in the 1991 elections.

Overview
The Hong Kong government's assumed the two-seat constituencies would produce a mixture of liberal, rural conservative and business representatives as well as some members of the "united front" organisations which supported by Beijing, as the voters would cast their ballots for prominent individuals rather than a "party" label. However, the two-seat and two-vote system benefited the pro-democracy coalition in the end.

The election was largely affected by the events in May and June 1989 in China when the Tiananmen Square protest was bloodily cracked down by the Beijing government. The events sparked the great fear among the Hong Kong population who closely concerned or enthusiastically supported the student movement. The pro-democracy groups supported the student protests by forming the Hong Kong Alliance in Support of Patriotic Democratic Movements in China in May 1989. After the crackdown, the liberal leaders, Martin Lee and Szeto Wah had been labelled as "subversives" by the Beijing government and expelled form the Hong Kong Basic Law Drafting Committee. In 1990, members of the three major pro-democracy groups, the Meeting Point, the Hong Kong Affairs Society and the Association for Democracy and People's Livelihood came together under the banner of the United Democrats of Hong Kong, which self-proclaimed as the first political party in Hong Kong.

The pro-democracy liberals won a landslide in the geographical constituency direct elections. The United Democrats led by Martin Lee became the largest party, by winning 12 of the 18 seats in the geographical constituencies. Two other seats went to its ally Meeting Point headed by Anthony Cheung. Frederick Fung, Chairman of the ADPL won a seat in Kowloon West. Of the remaining seats, one went to a liberal independent Emily Lau, one to an independent incumbent Andrew Wong and the other to an incumbent rural conservative Tai Chin-wah.

The conservative Liberal Democratic Federation of Hong Kong, newly founded in 1990 mainly by business and professional groups favouring collaboration with Beijing, polled only 5.1% of the vote. None of its candidates were elected in the direct elections. The pro-Beijing "united front" organisations received only 7.9% of the vote and were also very easily defeated. Chan Yuen-han, the Hong Kong Federation of Trade Unions (FTU) candidate in Kowloon Central polled about 11,000 votes fewer than the second place United Democrat, Dr. Conrad Lam and was about 23,000 votes behind the winner, United Democrat Lau Chin-shek. In Island East, Cheng Kai-nam who had the support of a pro-Beijing group, Hong Kong Citizen Forum, polled 29,902 against the United Democrats' leader Martin Lee, who received 76,831 votes.

The advantage of the liberals was balanced with the functional constituency indirectly elected by the limited electorates of the business and professional sectors as well as the appointed members by the government. the Chief Secretary Sir David Ford said on television that the elections should be seen in the context of a 50% registration rate, of whom perhaps only 50% might turn out at the polls therefore the majority who were not represented would be reserved by appointing members who might be thought to represent those who had not registered or had not voted.

General results

|-
!style="background-color:#E9E9E9;text-align:center;" rowspan=2 colspan=3 |Political affiliation 
!style="background-color:#E9E9E9;text-align:right;" colspan=4 |Geographical constituencies
!style="background-color:#E9E9E9;text-align:right;" colspan=4 |Functional constituencies
!style="background-color:#E9E9E9;text-align:right;" rowspan=2 |Totalseats
|-
!style="background-color:#E9E9E9;text-align:right;"|Votes
!style="background-color:#E9E9E9;text-align:right;"|%
!style="background-color:#E9E9E9;text-align:right;"|Candidates
!style="background-color:#E9E9E9;text-align:right;"|Seats
!style="background-color:#E9E9E9;text-align:right;"|Votes
!style="background-color:#E9E9E9;text-align:right;"|%
!style="background-color:#E9E9E9;text-align:right;"|Candidates
!style="background-color:#E9E9E9;text-align:right;"|Seats
|-
|rowspan=5 style="background-color:LightGreen;border-bottom-style:hidden;"|
| width=1px style="background-color: "|
|style="text-align:left;"|United Democrats of Hong Kong 
|618,209
|45.15
|14
|12
|15,208
|66.46
|3
|2
|14
|-
| width=1px style="background-color: " |
|style="text-align:left;"|Meeting Point 
|98,588
|7.20
|3
|2
|−
|−
|−
|−
|2
|-
| width=1px style="background-color: " |
|style="text-align:left;"|Hong Kong Democratic Foundation
|19,806
|1.45
|1
|0
|487
|2.13
|2
|2
|2
|-
| width=1px style="background-color: " |
|style="text-align:left;"|Hong Kong Association for Democracy and People's Livelihood 
|60,770
|4.44
|3
|1
|−
|−
|−
|−
|1
|-
| width=1px style="background-color: " |
|style="text-align:left;"|Independents and others 
|46,515
|3.40
|1
|1
|−
|−
|−
|−
|1
|-style="background-color:LightGreen"
|colspan=3 style="text-align:left;"|Total for Liberals
|843,888
|61.63
|22
|16
|15,695
|68.59
|5
|4
|20
|-
|rowspan=3 style="background-color:LightBlue;border-bottom-style:hidden;" |
| width=1px style="background-color: " |
|style="text-align:left;"| Liberal Democratic Federation of Hong Kong
|69,832
|5.10
|5
|0
|1,118
|4.89
|5
|3
|3
|-
| width=1px style="background-color: " |
|style="text-align:left;"| Business and Professionals Federation of Hong Kong
|−
|−
|−
|−
|968
|4.23
|3
|2
|2
|-
| width=1px style="background-color: " |
|style="text-align:left;"| Federation for the Stability of Hong Kong
|30,871
|2.25
|1
|1
|10
|0.04
|2
|1
|2
|-
|-style="background-color:LightBlue"
|colspan=3 style="text-align:left;"|Total for Conservatives
|100,703
|7.35
|6
|1
|2,096
|9.16
|10
|6
|7
|-
|rowspan=4 style="background-color:Pink"| 
| width=1px style="background-color: " |
|style="text-align:left;"|Hong Kong Federation of Trade Unions 
|44,894
|3.28
|1
|0
|–
|–
|1
|1
|1
|-
| width=1px style="background-color: " |
|style="text-align:left;"| New Hong Kong Alliance
|11,934
|0.87
|2
|0
|136
|0.59
|2
|1
|1
|-
| width=1px style="background-color:" |
|style="text-align:left;"| Hong Kong Citizen Forum
|29,902
|2.18
|1
|0
|−
|−
|−
|−
|0
|-
|style="background-color:#9E5238"|
|style="text-align:left;"| Kwun Tong Man Chung Friendship Promotion Association
|21,225
|1.55
|1
|0
|−
|−
|−
|−
|0
|-
|-style="background-color:Pink"
|colspan=3 style="text-align:left;"|Total for pro-Beijing
|107,955
|7.88
|5
|0
|136
|0.59
|3
|2
|2
|-
| width=1px style="background-color: " |
|colspan=2 style="text-align:left;"| Hong Kong and Kowloon Trades Union Council
|3,393
|0.25
|1
|0
|−
|−
|1
|1
|1
|-
| width=1px style="background-color: " |
|colspan=2 style="text-align:left;"| Hong Kong Civic Association
|14,145
|1.03
|1
|0
|−
|−
|−
|−
|0
|-
| width=1px style="background-color: " |
|colspan=2 style="text-align:left;"| Reform Club of Hong Kong
|8,257
|0.60
|1
|0
|−
|−
|−
|−
|0
|-
| width=1px style="background-color:#CC0000" |
|colspan=2 style="text-align:left;"| October Review
|3,431
|0.25
|1
|0
|−
|−
|−
|−
|0
|-
| width=1px style="background-color: " |
|colspan=2 style="text-align:left;"|Independents and others 
|287,561
|21.00
|17
|1
|4,957
|21.66
|21
|8
|9
|-
|style="text-align:left;background-color:#E9E9E9" colspan="3"|Total (turnout 39.15%)
|width="30" style="text-align:right;background-color:#E9E9E9"|1,369,333
|style="text-align:right;background-color:#E9E9E9"|100.00
|width="75" style="text-align:right;background-color:#E9E9E9"|54
|width="30" style="text-align:right;background-color:#E9E9E9"|18
|width="30" style="text-align:right;background-color:#E9E9E9"|22,884
|style="text-align:right;background-color:#E9E9E9"|100.00
|width="75" style="text-align:right;background-color:#E9E9E9"|40
|style="text-align:right;background-color:#E9E9E9"|21
|width="30" style="text-align:right;background-color:#E9E9E9"|39 
|}
Note: There were also 18 members appointed by the Governor and 3 Ex-Officio members.

Votes summary

Seats summary

Result breakdown

Geographical Constituencies

Functional Constituencies

References

Bibliography
 An Overview of the Hong Kong Legislative Council Elections of 1991 The Asian Journal of Public Administration Vol. 13 No. 2 (1991 Dec).

Hong Kong
1991 in Hong Kong
Legislative
1991 elections in British Overseas Territories
September 1991 events in Asia